Christian Bodiong Ebala (born March 17, 1988) is a Cameroonian footballer whose last known club was Kecskeméti TE.

Career
In July 2010 Ebala signed a three-year contract, with the option of two more, with Kecskeméti TE. In March 2012 Ebala, along with teammate Foxi Kéthévoama, joined Kazakhstan Premier League side FC Astana on a season-long loan deal.

References

External links
 Profile

Living people
1988 births
Footballers from Yaoundé
Cameroonian footballers
Association football midfielders
Diósgyőri VTK players
Újpest FC players
Bőcs KSC footballers
Kazincbarcikai SC footballers
Kecskeméti TE players
FC Astana players
Nemzeti Bajnokság I players
Cameroonian expatriate footballers
Expatriate footballers in Hungary
Expatriate footballers in Kazakhstan
Cameroonian expatriate sportspeople in Hungary